Osmia alfkenii is a species of bee native to the West Palearctic. Its regional distribution is in the regions of Béni Mellal-Khénifra Drâa-Tafilalet and Souss-Massa It was described by Adolpho Ducke in 1899.

References

alfkenii
Insects described in 1899